Sasho is a male given name that is a diminutive of Alexander (meaning "defender" or "protector of men") and which originates in Bulgaria and North Macedonia  The name may refer to:

Sasho Angelov (born 1969), Bulgarian football player and manager
Sasho Cirovski (born 1962), American football coach
Sasho Mijalkov (born 1965), Macedonian politician
Sasho Pargov (born 1946), Bulgarian football player
Sasho Petrovski (born 1975), Australian football player
Sasho Nikolov, Canadian theoretical computer scientist

See also
Sasha (disambiguation)

References

Bulgarian masculine given names
Macedonian masculine given names